The Samsung Galaxy Ace Plus (GT-S7500[L/T/W]) it was a later generation of the Samsung Galaxy Ace (S5830), which was released by Samsung in 2012. The phone weighs , has a display size of 3.65 inches and retains the same 320x480 resolution as the original Ace. Various new technologies and features were introduced as the phone came out.

Feature & Review 
For its features, Galaxy Ace Plus contains a 1 GHz processor in order to carry all the applications and games on the phone. There is one back camera with auto-focus (there is no front camera), an A-GPS, microUSB2.0, Bluetooth, Wi-Fi, radio, 3 GB of internal memory, and microSD (up to 32 GB) external memory. The black colour palette with softened edges gives this phone a modern shape. The hand-small size is the most attractive point of this phone. This feature offers convenience for users to carry their phones around. 
Galaxy Ace Plus has running Android 4.0.4 ice cream sandwich, has strong mobile operations and speedy. It has a 365mb RAM which has come under fire for being too small.

Instant Messaging Service 
Moreover, the Galaxy series involves in Samsung’s own instant messaging service, called ChatON. Users text each other or start multi-person conversations, multimedia file sharing etc. by applying their own phone numbers instead of creating username and password. This mobile function drives a similar application as iPhone’s iMessage and BlackBerry’s BlackBerry Messenger.

System and Screen Control 
Galaxy Ace Plus includes the upgraded GUI and TouchWiz 4.0 interface. The lockscreen and menus are simply designed with simple backgrounds. The Ace Plus has the integration of missed events with shortcuts to the relevant apps. Touchscreen is allowed and swiping gesture is basically the only way to use it. Users can have up to 7 homescreens. They can be rearranged, deleted, or added at any points when the users want samsung  to.

Social Phonebook and Social Hub 
As many modern phones offer now, Galaxy Ace Plus also has a wide range of perfectly organized phonebook and practically unlimited storage capacity. The contact book does not only show the contacts that users stored before, but it also syncs contacts from those social networking the users use. Also, the phonebook offers a Quick contacts feature, where the users can set up quick contact people specifically. 
Social Hub combines the users email accounts with social networking (Facebook, Twitter, Instagram etc.) so that all incoming emails are collected on one list, the owners are able to mark them as favorites, have shortcuts to reply, manage the inflow of incoming updates and so on.

Google Apps 
The Samsung Galaxy Ace Plus contains an A-GPS, which offers as the same functions as Google Maps. It offers voice-guided navigation in certain countries and displays instructions elsewhere. Ace Plus offers the latest Google Maps version, which the data is very efficient and easy to cache. The app will recalculate and reroute users if they get off course, even without a WiFi connection.  3D buildings are shown on the phone. 
Besides, the Ace Plus accesses to connect to the Android Market, as known as Google Play now. This is a big storage of database, where users can download all the applications they need. If you have used iTunes before, then it will be much easier to adapt Google Play.

See also 
 Samsung Galaxy Ace
 Samsung Galaxy Ace 2

References 

S7500
Samsung smartphones
Android (operating system) devices
Mobile phones introduced in 2012